Articulate is an American weekly public television documentary series on the creative arts hosted by Irish-American journalist Jim Cotter.

Background
Articulate profiles artists and how they interact with the world around them, with weekly 30-minute episodes on visual arts, crafts, ceramics, music, dance, photography, literature, and many other forms of art and expression. Going beyond art history and culture, Articulate takes an interdisciplinary look at the many different forms of human creative expression and delves into philosophical topics such as the nature of human existence. The television series debuted in 2015, with episodes still currently in production. Articulate’s diverse guests come from around the world; many episodes are filmed on location.

The show's host, Jim Cotter, was born in County Kerry, Ireland. After working for the BBC, Cotter moved to the United States to pursue a career in journalism and television.

Broadcast history
Articulate first premiered on January 8, 2015, and originally aired on WHYY-TV in Philadelphia. It airs on public television stations across the United States, including New Hampshire, Illinois, Colorado, California, Arizona, Texas, and many other states. It is currently broadcast on more than 110 public television stations.

Articulate is currently produced by Panavista, Inc., a Philadelphia-based independent film company which specializes in producing documentaries.

Awards
In 2017, Panavista, Inc. won a Mid-Atlantic Emmy Awards in the Best Historic/Cultural Program Feature/Segment category. The award was for Articulate’s segment, “A Place at the Table,” about woodworker George Nakashima’s daughter, Mira Nakashima.

In 2020, Articulate was nominated for a Daytime Emmy Award in the Outstanding Multiple Camera Editing category, and won the Daytime Emmy Award in the Outstanding Sound Mixing category for the episode “Andrew Bird: Whistling While He Works.” 
 
In 2021, Articulate was nominated for a Daytime Emmy Award in the Outstanding Arts and Popular Culture Program category.

Episodes
Below is a full list of Articulate episodes and  featured guests, listed by season.

Season 1 (2017)
Season 1 episodes and featured guests are:

Season 2 (2017)
Season 2 episodes and featured guests are:

Season 3 (2018)
Season 3 episodes and featured guests are:

Season 4 (2018)
Season 4 episodes and featured guests are:

Season 5 (2019)
Season 5 episodes and featured guests are:

Season 6 (2020)
Season 6 episodes and featured guests are:

Season 7 (2021)
Season 7 episodes and featured guests are:

Season 8 (2021)
Season 8 episodes and featured guests are:

Season 9 (2022) 

Season 9 episodes and featured guests are:

Notes and references

External links
  (official site)
 Articulate at PBS
 Jim Cotter (official site of host)
 Panavista, Inc. (production company)
 

2015 American television series debuts
English-language television shows
PBS original programming